Charles Andrew Williams (born June 17, 1994) is an American football long snapper who is currently a free agent. He played college football at South Carolina.

College career
Williams started as a true freshman for the Gamecocks and played every game.

Professional career
On January 2, 2018, Williams signed a reserve/future contract with the Arizona Cardinals. He was waived on May 1, 2018.

References

External links

1994 births
Living people
American football long snappers
Arizona Cardinals players
People from Irmo, South Carolina
South Carolina Gamecocks football players